A - B - C - D - E - F - G - H - I - J - K - L - M - N - O - P - Q - R - S - T - U - V - W - XYZ

This is a list of rivers in the United States that have names starting with the letter J.  For the main page, which includes links to listings by state, see List of rivers in the United States.

J 
Jacks River - Georgia
Jacks Fork - Missouri
Jackson River - Virginia
Jail Branch River - Vermont
James Fork - Arkansas, Oklahoma
James River - Missouri
James River - North Dakota, South Dakota
James River - Virginia
Jarbidge River - Nevada, Idaho
Jefferson River - Montana
Jemez River - New Mexico
Jeremy River - Connecticut
John River - Alaska
John Day River - northeastern Oregon
John Day River - northwestern Oregon
Johns River - New Hampshire
Johnson Creek - Oregon
Jones River - Massachusetts
Jordan River - Michigan
Jordan River - Utah
Jordan River - Virginia
Jorgenson River - South Dakota
Jourdan River - Mississippi
Judith River - Montana
Jump River - Wisconsin
Juniata River - Pennsylvania

J